The 1999–00 Luxembourg Cup was the seventh playing of the Luxembourg Cup ice hockey tournament. Five teams participated in the tournament, which was won by Galaxians d'Amneville II.

Final standings

External links 
 Season on hockeyarchives.info

Luxembourg Cup
Luxembourg Cup (ice hockey) seasons